John Neagle (November 4, 1796 – September 17, 1865) was a fashionable American painter, primarily of portraits, during the first half of the 19th century in Philadelphia.

Biography
Neagle was born in Boston, Massachusetts.  His training in art began with instruction from the drawing-master Pietro Ancora and an apprenticeship to Thomas Wilson, a well-connected painter of signs and coaches in Philadelphia.  Wilson introduced him to the painters Bass Otis and Thomas Sully, and Neagle became a protégé of the latter.  In 1818 Neagle decided to concentrate exclusively on portraits, setting up shop as an independent master.

Aside from brief sojourns in Lexington, Kentucky, and New Orleans, Louisiana, he spent his career in Philadelphia, Pennsylvania, where he died.  In May 1826 he married Sully's stepdaughter Mary, and for a time the son-in-law and father-in-law dominated the field of portraiture in the city.  Neagle served as Director of the Pennsylvania Academy of the Fine Arts, and was also a founder and president (1835–43) of the Artist's Fund Society of Philadelphia.

Works
Neagle's sitters included society figures, politicians, professionals and merchants, all of whom he treated with an incisive attention to psychology and an often dazzling brushwork derived (by way of Sully and Sir Thomas Lawrence) ultimately from van Dyck.  His most impressive works are, arguably, the full-length allegorical Portrait of Henry Clay (Union League, Philadelphia), and the unconventional and brutally heroic Pat Lyon at the Forge (Pennsylvania Academy of the Fine Arts).

Other Neagle sitters included Vice President Richard Mentor Johnson, Governor John Jordan Crittenden of Kentucky, Congressman James Harper and his wife Charlotte, the Marquis de Lafayette, Bishop William Meade, Dr. William Potts Dewees, author James Fenimore Cooper, fellow painter Gilbert Stuart, actor Edwin Forrest and the architects William Strickland, John Haviland and Thomas Ustick Walter as well as Pawnee Indian and hero of the whites Petalesharo.  His papers are housed at the Historical Society of Pennsylvania, which hosted a retrospective exhibition of his work in 1989 (with scholarly catalogue by Robert Torchia).

Sixteen paintings of actors in character by Neagle are housed in the library at The Players in New York City.

Gallery

References

External links

The John Neagle papers and related items, consisting mostly of volumes related to his work and cased photographs, are available for research use at the Historical Society of Pennsylvania

1796 births
1865 deaths
Artists from Boston
19th-century American painters
19th-century American male artists
American male painters
Pennsylvania Academy of the Fine Arts faculty
Burials in Pennsylvania
Artists from Philadelphia